Valentino Etno is a Bosnian commercial cable television channel based in Brčko, Bosnia and Herzegovina. This television channel mainly broadcasts Turbo-folk or root music (etno) shows. The program is mainly produced in the Bosnian language and it is available via cable systems throughout the Bosnia and Herzegovina.

References

External links 
 Valentino BiH
 Communications Regulatory Agency of Bosnia and Herzegovina

Mass media in Brčko District
Television stations in Bosnia and Herzegovina